Linnett is a surname. Notable people with the surname include:

John Linnett (politician) (1859–1902), member of the Queensland Legislative Assembly
John Wilfrid Linnett (1913–1975), chemist  
John Barnes Linnett, nineteenth century printer
Kane Linnett (born 1989), Australian rugby league footballer